The 2018 Campeonato Brasileiro Série A (officially the Brasileirão Assaí 2018 for sponsorship reasons) was the 62nd season of the Campeonato Brasileiro Série A, the top level of professional football in Brazil, and the 15th edition in a double round-robin since its establishment in 2003. The season began on 14 April 2018 and ended on 2 December 2018. The top six teams as well as the 2018 Copa do Brasil champions qualified to the Copa Libertadores. The next six best-placed teams not qualified for Copa Libertadores qualified for the Copa Sudamericana and the last four were relegated to Série B in 2019.

Palmeiras won their 10th title, which is the most titles in the tournament.

Teams

Twenty teams competed in the league – the top sixteen teams from the previous season, as well as four teams promoted from the Série B.

América Mineiro became the first club to be promoted after a 1–2 win against Figueirense on 11 November 2017. Internacional was promoted on 14 November 2017, and Paraná and Ceará were promoted on 18 November 2017.

{|
|- style="horizontal-align: top;"
|

</td>

|}

Number of teams by state

Stadiums and locations

Personnel and kits

Managerial changes

Foreign players
The clubs can have a maximum of five foreign players in their Campeonato Brasileiro squads per match, but there is no limit of foreigners in the clubs' squads.

1 Players holding Brazilian dual nationality.

Standings

League table

Results

Attendance

Average home attendances

Ranked from highest to lowest average attendance.

Season statistics

Top scorers

Source: Globoesporte.com

Assists 

Source: ESPN Deportes

Hat-tricks

Clean sheets

Source: FoxSports.com

Awards

Team of the year

Annual awards

References 

Campeonato Brasileiro Série A seasons
Campeonato Brasileiro Série A
Brazil